Gecko Stroll is Taiwanese Mandopop artist Will Pan's debut Mandarin solo studio album. It was released by Universal Music Taiwan on 20 December 2002.  A second edition was released which includes a VCD with 6 MV's.

The track "Kiss Me 123" is listed at number 85 on Hit Fm Taiwan's Hit Fm Annual Top 100 Singles Chart (Hit-Fm年度百首單曲) for 2003.

Track listing

Music video
 "壁虎漫步" (Gecko Stroll) MV
 "Tell Me" MV
 "Just When I Needed You Most" MV
 "我不怕" (I'm Not Afraid) MV
 "Kiss Me 123" MV
 "Good Love" MV
 "X Spy" MV
 "站在你這邊" (By My Side) MV
 "學不會" (Can Not Learn) MV

Notes

References

External links
  Will Pan discography@Universal Music Taiwan

2002 debut albums
Will Pan albums
Universal Music Taiwan albums